Karl-Heinz Marotzke (born 29 March 1934) is a German former football coach.

He managed 1963–1964 SF Hamborn 07 leading the club to 14th place in the second division Regionalliga. From 1964 to 1966 he led VfL Osnabrück to 10th and 7th places in the second division. In the 1966–67 season he coached Eredivisie club Fortuna '54 finishing 14th. His appointment in 1967 with German first division Bundesliga club FC Schalke 04 was largely considered surprising ("inexperienced"). Early November, after 13 matchdays with a balance of nine defeats, three draws and only one win the club was on last position and he was let go. The club retained its spot in the league under his successor Günter Brocker.

From 1968 to 1970 he coached Ghana, which he led through the football tournament of the 1968 Olympics in Mexico, exiting there after the opening group phase with two draws and one defeat. After this he had appointments from 1970 to 1971 and 1974 with Nigeria and in 2001 with Botswana.

References

External links
 

1934 births
Living people
German football managers
FC Schalke 04 managers
Botswana national football team managers
VfL Osnabrück managers
Ghana national football team managers
Nigeria national football team managers
German expatriate football managers
German expatriate sportspeople in Ghana
Expatriate football managers in Ghana
German expatriate sportspeople in Nigeria
Expatriate football managers in Nigeria
1970 African Cup of Nations managers